Amblychaeturichthys is a small genus of gobies native to the northwestern Pacific Ocean.

Species
There are currently two recognized species in this genus:
 Amblychaeturichthys hexanema (Bleeker, 1853)
 Amblychaeturichthys sciistius (D. S. Jordan & Snyder, 1901)

References 

Gobionellinae